California Proposition 91 was a failed proposal to amend the California Constitution to prohibit motor vehicle fuel sales taxes that are earmarked for transportation purposes from being retained in the state's general fund. The proposition appeared on the ballot of the February primary election.

Proposal 
The proposition prohibits certain motor vehicle fuel sales and use taxes, that are earmarked for the Transportation Investment Fund, from being retained in the General Fund. Such taxes may be retained if the Governor issues a proclamation, a special statute is enacted by a 2/3 vote of the Legislature, repayment occurs within three years, and certain other conditions are met.

The proposition also requires repayment by June 30, 2017 of such vehicle fuel taxes retained in General Fund from July 1, 2003 to June 30, 2008. Currently, repayment is generally required by June 30, 2016.

It also changes how and when General Fund borrowing of certain transportation funds is allowed.

Fiscal impacts 
Increases stability of state funding for highways, streets, and roads and may decrease stability of state funding for public transit. May reduce stability of certain local funds for public transit.

Developments before election 
Proponents of Proposition 91 asked voters to vote "no" on Proposition 91 because the passage of Proposition 1A in 2006 has already prevented the use of gas tax dollars from being spent for non-transportation purposes. However, an independent campaign to pass Proposition 1A has been sponsored separately by the Southern California Transit Advocates, a non-profit transit advocacy organization. Other supporters include State Senator Tom McClintock and former State Senator Bill Leonard.

Results

References

External links
Yes on 91 (website archived by UCLA Online Campaign Literature Archive)
Proposition 91 Voter Information Guide

2008 California ballot propositions
Failed amendments to the Constitution of California
Initiatives in the United States